Warraber Islet is an island locality in the Torres Strait Island Region, Queensland, Australia. It consists of a single island, Sue Islet (also known as Warraber), the middle island of The Three Sisters. The only town is Sue Island on the north-west part of the island.

Education
Warraber Island Campus is a primary (Early Childhood-6) campus of Tagai State College.

There is no secondary school on the island. The nearest secondary school is on Thursday Island.

References 

Torres Strait Island Region
Localities in Queensland